2006 World Ice Hockey Championships may refer to:
 2006 Men's World Ice Hockey Championships
 2006 World Junior Ice Hockey Championships
 2006 IIHF World U18 Championships